EPOR may refer to:

 European Patent Office Reports
 Erythropoietin receptor